The Cueva were an indigenous tribe which was one of the first in Panama, along with the Kamëntsá. When the Spanish invaded Panama throughout the 16th century, the Cueva began dying out, and were extinct by 1535.

See also 
 Cueva language
 Kuna

References

Further reading 
 Whitehead, Neil L. (1999). The crises and transformations of invaded societies: The Caribbean (1492–1580). In F. Salomon & S. B. Schwartz (Eds.), The Cambridge history of the native peoples of South America: South America (Vol. 3, Pt. 1, pp. 864–903). Cambridge: Cambridge University Press.

History of Panama
Ethnic groups in Panama
Extinct_ethnic_groups